William Henderson Pringle (1877-23 April 1967), was a Scottish Liberal Party politician and economist.

Background
He was the son of the Reverend John Pringle. He was educated at Hamilton Academy and privately, the University of Edinburgh, the University of Glasgow and the London School of Economics. He married Annie Nelson Forrest. They had one son and one daughter. She died in 1961. In 1965 he married Agnes Ross.

Career
In 1905 he was Called to the Bar, at Lincoln's Inn. He was the recognised teacher of Economics and University Extension Lecturer, at the University of London from 1910–20. He worked at the Ministry of Munitions, Labour Department, from 1915–16 and the Ministry of Reconstruction, from 1917–19. He was Lecturer on Economics, at Birkbeck College, University of London, from 1918–20. He was Professor of Economics, at the University of New Zealand, from 1920–22. He was a Lecturer at the London School of Economics, from 1923–24. He was the Principal of the City of Birmingham Commercial College, from 1925–42.

Political career
At parliamentary General Elections he contested, as a Liberal party candidate Berwick and Haddington in 1922, 

Ayr Burghs in 1923 

and Berwick and Haddington again in 1924. 

He did not stand for parliament again. He was a Scottish Representative of the New Commonwealth Society.

References

1877 births
1967 deaths
Scottish Liberal Party parliamentary candidates